Balukabela.com is a Bengali language film directed by Partha Sen. The film was world-premiered in London in May 2012.

Cast 
 Parambrata Chattopadhyay
 Locket Chatterjee
 Payel Roy
 Ambalika
 Taniya
 Indranil
 Abhiraj
 Rudranil Ghosh
 Rahul
 Bratya Basu
 Saswata Chatterjee

Plot Summary
A runaway couple decide to celebrate their wedding anniversary at the beachside Balukabela hotel. A game of hide and seek commences, when their boss visits the same hotel to find solace.

See also 
 Aborto
 Goynar Baksho

References 

2012 films
Bengali-language Indian films
2010s Bengali-language films

Films scored by Raja Narayan Deb